Patrick Osborne may refer to:

Patrick Osborne (animator), American animator and film director
Patrick Osborne (rugby union) (born 1987), Fijian rugby union footballer
Patrick Osborne (politician) (1832–1902), Australian politician